Hancock is an English surname. It is derived from a given name, a variant of John (Johan) combined with the hypocoristic  suffix -cok which came into fashion in the 13th century, from cok "cock", applied to "a young lad who strutted proudly like a cock". As a given name,  Hanecok is recorded in the 13th century in the Hundred Rolls of Yorkshire. The Dictionary of American Family Names mentions an alternative Dutch etymology, from hanecoc "periwinkle".

An Irish variation is Handcock, as borne by William Handcock, 1st Viscount Castlemaine.

People from Australia

 H. R. Hancock "Captain" Hancock (1836–1919) mine superintendent of Moonta, South Australia
 Keith Hancock (historian) (1898–1988), historian
 Lang Hancock (1909–1992), iron ore magnate
 Michael Hancock (rugby league) (born 1969), rugby league footballer
 Robert Hancock (footballer) (1922–1973), Australian rules footballer

People from Canada

 Robert E. W. Hancock (born 1949), microbiologist

People from the United Kingdom

 Albany Hancock (1806–1873), English naturalist, biologist, and supporter of Charles Darwin
 Anthony Hancock (publisher) (1947–2012), British publisher of right-wing material
 Frank Hancock (1859–1943), Wales international rugby captain
 Froude Hancock (1865–1933), English international rugby union player
 Graham Hancock (born 1950), non-fiction author and journalist
 Jake Hancock (1928–2004), geologist specialising in the Cretaceous period
 Matthew (Matt) Hancock (born 1978), Conservative Party politician
 Nick Hancock (born 1962), actor and television presenter
 Sir Patrick Hancock (1914–1980), diplomat, ambassador to Israel, Norway, and Italy
 Ralph Hancock (cricketer) (1887–1914), English cricketer
 Ralph Hancock (landscape gardener) (1893–1950), Welsh garden designer
 Robert Hancock (engraver) (1730–1817), British engraver and draughtsman
 Sam Hancock (born 1980), race car driver
 Sheila Hancock (born 1933), actress and comedian
 Stephen Hancock (1925–2015), actor
 Thomas Hancock (inventor) (1786–1865), inventor
 Tony Hancock (1924–1968), comedian on Hancock's Half Hour radio and television series
 Tysoe Saul Hancock (1723–1775), English East India Company surgeon
 William Hancock (ophthalmologist) (1873–1910), English ophthalmologist and sportsman
 William John Hancock (1864–1931), telephone and X-ray pioneer in Western Australia

People from the United States
 Allan Hancock (1875–1965), heir to Rancho La Brea, developer of Hancock Park, Los Angeles
 Clarence E. Hancock (1885–1948), politician of New York, namesake of the Syracuse Hancock International Airport
 Cornelia Hancock (1839–1926), nurse during the American Civil War
 George Allan Hancock (1875–1965), Californian oil magnate
 Greg Hancock (born 1970), motorcycle speedway rider
 H. Irving Hancock (Harrie Irving Hancock) (1868–1922), writer, mainly for children
 Hank Hancock (born 1936), politician
 Harris Hancock (1867–1944), mathematician
 Henry Hancock (1822–1883), landowner in Southern California, owner of Rancho La Brea
 Herbie Hancock (born 1940), jazz musician
 James Hughes Hancock (born 1931–2020), Judge of the United States District Court for the Northern District of Alabama
 John Hancock (1737–1793), American Revolutionary; signatory to the United States Declaration of Independence
 Josh Hancock (1978–2007), pitcher for the St. Louis Cardinals
 Keith Hancock (musician) (born 1980), music educator, Grammy award winner
 Levi W. Hancock (1803–1882), pioneer of Church of Jesus Christ of Latter-day Saints (Mormons)
 Luke Hancock (born 1990), basketball player
 Mary Louise Hancock (1920–2017), New Hampshire politician and activist
 Mel Hancock (1929–2011), U.S. Congressman from Missouri, best known for Missouri's Hancock Amendment
 Michael Hancock (Colorado politician) (born 1969), Mayor of Denver, Colorado
 Tom Hancock (1948–2016), U.S. politician from Iowa
 Tommy Hancock (1929–2020), musician
 Trenton Doyle Hancock (born 1974), artist
 Vincent Hancock (born 1989), Olympic shooter
 Winfield Scott Hancock (1824–1886), Union general during the American Civil War

Fictional characters
Alexandra Hancock, or Aunt Alexandra, character in To Kill a Mockingbird
Boa Hancock, character in the One Piece manga and anime series; in this instance, Hancock is a given name
Emily Hancock, from Australian soap opera Neighbours
Matt Hancock, from Australian soap opera Neighbours
John Hancock, main character in the 2008 film Hancock
John Hancock, character in the Fallout 4 video game

See also
Anthony Hancock (disambiguation)
Emily Hancock (disambiguation)
George Hancock (disambiguation)
John Hancock (disambiguation)
Michael Hancock (disambiguation)
Thomas Hancock (disambiguation)
William Hancock (disambiguation)

Hancox

References

English-language surnames